Municipal elections were held in the Czech Republic on 5 and 6 October 2018, alongside elections for the Senate.

Results

References

Municipal elections in the Czech Republic
Municipal
Czech